Ninja Spirit, known in Japan as , is a 1988 platform game developed and released in arcades by Irem. Although praised by gamers for detailed graphics, serious themes, solid controls and gameplay, the game also was criticized for its harsh difficulty.

Gameplay 

Tsukikage's journey takes him through seven stages, varying from woodlands, wastelands, swamps, temples, and cliffs. Each stage begins with the player slashing their way to the end until they confront a level boss.

The ninja is always armed with the katana named Muramasa (meaning Righteous Cloud), which can be fluidly used to attack in all directions. Extra weapons include the Uzha (meaning Swirling Leaf) (shurikens), the Raitake (meaning Bamboo Thunder) bombs, and the Shoryusai (meaning Rising Dragon) kusarigama. There are also several power-up items, such as one unleashing multiple ninja ghosts to assist the player.

Plot 
The game's hero, is a young ninja who lost his father to a mysterious half-man half-beast creature. The plot of Ninja Spirit is based on the quest of his way to avenge his father in an alternative feudal Japan.

Ports 
The game was successfully ported onto multiple platforms. The most popular port is the TurboGrafx-16 format which includes two modes: the PC Engine mode which players lose one life only if all 5 energy points are used up (certain enemies can kill Tsukikage with one hit), and the Arcade mode, which is a more challenging mode where any attack are grounds for players to lose one ninja instantly. That version was ported to the Nintendo Wii's Virtual Console on 14 May 2007, was delisted on 30 March 2012 and was available again on 17 September 2013 in Japan and on 19 September 2013 in North America and Europe. The same version was re-released on the Nintendo Wii U's Virtual Console on 14 January 2015 in Japan, 27 July 2017 in North America and 10 August 2017 in Europe.

Soundtrack 
The original soundtrack for the game was released on December 21, 1988 by Alfa Records.

Reception 

In Japan, Game Machine listed Ninja Spirit on their September 1, 1988 issue as being the fifth most-successful table arcade unit of the month, outperforming titles like The Main Event.

In Issue 15 of Electronic Gaming Monthly, both Ninja Spirit and Ys Book I & II were the first games to receive a perfect 10 in the magazine's history. In 2010, CraveOnline featured this version in the article Top 10 Ninja Games Of All Time, commenting: "Ninja Spirit for the TurboGrafx-16 was a lot like “Legend of Kage” on the NES, except better in every way ... both challenging and sort of relaxing at the same time."

Legacy
Ninja Spirit later appeared in the Japan-only Game Boy title, Shuyaku Sentai Irem Fighter along with other characters from the game, as well as characters from three other Irem franchises: R-Type, Mr. Heli, and Hammerin' Harry.

References

External links 
Ninja Spirit at Atari Mania

Ninja Spirit Strategy Guide (TurboGrafx-16) at TurboPlay Magazine Archives

1988 video games
Amiga games
Amstrad CPC games
Arcade video games
Atari ST games
Commodore 64 games
Game Boy games
Irem games
Video games about ninja
Nintendo Switch games
Platform games
PlayStation 4 games
Side-scrolling video games
TurboGrafx-16 games
Video games developed in Japan
Video games set in feudal Japan
Virtual Console games
Virtual Console games for Wii U
ZX Spectrum games
Single-player video games
Hamster Corporation games